Groom High School is a public high school located in the city of Groom in Carson County, Texas (USA). It is classified as a 1A school by the UIL. It is a part of the Groom Independent School District located in extreme southeastern Carson County. In 2015, the school was rated "Met Standard" by the Texas Education Agency.

Athletics
The Groom Tigers compete in these sports - 

Basketball
Cross Country
6-Man Football
Tennis
Track and Field

State Finalist
Football - 
1975(B), 1999(6M/D1), 2014(6M/D2)

See also
List of Six-man football stadiums in Texas

References

External links
Groom ISD website
The Times of the Tiger - Groom High School Online Newspaper

Public high schools in Texas
Schools in Carson County, Texas